Joanna Hardin is an American softball coach who is the current head coach at Virginia.

Coaching career

McNeese State
On June 5, 2014, Joanna Hardin was announced as the new head coach of the McNeese State softball program, replacing Mike Smith who left to be the head coach at Ole Miss.

Virginia
On June 10, 2016, Joanna Hardin was announced as the new head coach of the Virginia softball program.

Head coaching record

College

References

Living people
Female sports coaches
American softball coaches
Virginia Cavaliers softball coaches
Biola Eagles softball players
McNeese Cowgirls softball coaches
Liberty Lady Flames softball coaches
Year of birth missing (living people)
Sportspeople from Fullerton, California